Sittisak Petpayathai (สิทธิศักดิ์ เพชรพญาไท) is a Muay Thai fighter.

Titles and accomplishments

Lumpinee Stadium
 2016 Lumpinee Stadium 135 lbs Champion
Channel 7 Stadium
 2002 Channel 7 Boxing Stadium 108 lbs Champion
 2006 Channel 7 Boxing Stadium 122 lbs Champion
 2010 Channel 7 Boxing Stadium 130 lbs Champion
 2019 Channel 7 Boxing Stadium 135 lbs Champion
Professional Boxing Association of Thailand (PAT)
 2011 Thailand 130 lbs Champion
Omnoi Stadium
 2015 Omnoi Boxing Stadium 135 lbs Champion
World Professional Muaythai Federation
2015 WPMF World 135 lbs Champion
World Muay Thai Organization
 2018 WMO World 140 lbs Champion
International Federation of Muaythai Associations
2014 I.F.M.A. World Muaythai Championships -67 kg

Fight record

|-  style="background:#fbb;"
| 2019-12-15 || Loss||align=left| Teeradet Chor.Hapayak || Channel 7 Boxing Stadium || Bangkok, Thailand || Decision || 5 || 3:00
|-  style="background:#cfc;"
| 2019-10-20 || Win||align=left| Tapaokaew Singmawynn || Channel 7 Boxing Stadium || Bangkok, Thailand || Decision || 5 || 3:00
|-
! style=background:white colspan=9 |
|-  style="background:#cfc;"
| 2019-07-07 || Win||align=left| Sibsaen Tor.JaroenthongPhuket || Channel 7 Boxing Stadium || Bangkok, Thailand || Decision || 5 || 3:00
|-
! style=background:white colspan=9 |
|-  style="background:#fbb;"
| 2019-04-14 || Loss ||align=left| Sibsaen Tor.JaroenthongPhuket || Channel 7 Boxing Stadium || Bangkok, Thailand || Decision || 5 || 3:00
|-  style="background:#cfc;"
| 2019-02-10 || Win||align=left| Mahadej P.K.SaenchaiMuayThaiGym || Channel 7 Boxing Stadium || Bangkok, Thailand || Decision || 5 || 3:00
|-
! style=background:white colspan=9 |
|-  style="background:#cfc;"
| 2018-12-02 || Win||align=left| Ferrari Jakrayanmuaythai || Channel 7 Boxing Stadium || Bangkok, Thailand || Decision || 5 || 3:00
|-  style="background:#fbb;"
| 2018-10-07 || Loss ||align=left| Mahadej P.K.SaenchaiMuayThaiGym || Channel 7 Boxing Stadium || Bangkok, Thailand || KO (Elbow) ||  ||
|- style="background:#cfc;"
| 2018-08-11 || Win ||align=left| Kiatpetch Suanaharnpeekmai || Lumpinee Stadium || Bangkok, Thailand || Decision || 5 || 3:00
|-  style="background:#cfc;"
| 2018-07-01 || Win||align=left| Petchnamek P.K.SaenchaiMuayThaiGym || Channel 7 Boxing Stadium || Bangkok, Thailand || Decision || 5 || 3:00
|- style="background:#cfc;"
| 2018 || Win ||align=left| Rungsangtawan Sit.Or Boonchop ||  || Thailand || Decision || 5 || 3:00
|-
! style=background:white colspan=9 |
|-  style="background:#fbb;"
| 2017-01-21 || Loss ||align=left| Chalamthong Sitsanate|| Lumpinee Stadium || Bangkok, Thailand || Decision || 5 || 3:00
|-  style="background:#fbb;"
| 2016-09-11 || Loss ||align=left| Rambo Petch.Por.Tor.Or|| Channel 7 Boxing Stadium || Bangkok, Thailand || Decision || 5 || 3:00
|-
! style=background:white colspan=9 |
|- style="background:#cfc;"
| 2016-06-26 || Win ||align=left| Chujaroen Dabransarakarm || Lumpinee Stadium || Bangkok, Thailand || Decision || 5 || 3:00
|- style="background:#cfc;"
| 2016-06-03 || Win ||align=left| Chujaroen Dabransarakarm || Lumpinee Stadium || Bangkok, Thailand || Decision || 5 || 3:00
|-
! style=background:white colspan=9 |
|- style="background:#fbb;"
| 2016-03-07 || Loss ||align=left| Chujaroen Dabransarakarm || Sermthai Complex || Maha Sarakham Province Thailand || Decision || 5 || 3:00
|-  style="background:#fbb;"
| 2016-01-24 || Loss ||align=left| Yodpanomrung Jitmuangnon || Channel 7 Boxing Stadium || Bangkok, Thailand || Decision  || 5 || 3:00
|-
! style=background:white colspan=9 |
|-  style="background:#cfc;"
| 2015- || Win||align=left| Jeereethong Seatransferry ||  || Thailand || Decision  || 5 || 3:00
|-
! style=background:white colspan=9 |
|-  style="background:#cfc;"
| 2015-09-19 || Win||align=left| Phetmai Phumphanmuang || Channel 7 Boxing Stadium || Bangkok, Thailand || Decision  || 5 || 3:00
|-
! style=background:white colspan=9 |
|-  style="background:#fbb;"
| 2015-07-28 || Loss||align=left| Matt Embree || Topking World Series 4   || Hong Kong, China || KO (punches)|| 1 ||
|- style="background:#cfc;"
| 2015-05-31 || Loss ||align=left| Chujaroen Dabransarakarm || Channel 7 Boxing Stadium || Bangkok, Thailand || Decision || 5 || 3:00
|-  style="background:#fbb;"
| 2014-10-02 || Loss||align=left| Panpet Kiatjaroenchai ||  || Bangkok, Thailand || Decision || 5 || 3:00
|-  style="background:#cfc;"
| 2014-09-05 || Win||align=left| Denpanom Rongriankilarkorat || Lumpinee Stadium || Bangkok, Thailand || Decision || 5 || 3:00
|-  style="background:#fbb;"
| 2014-04-08 || Loss ||align=left| Yodpanomrung Jitmuangnon || Lumpinee Stadium || Bangkok, Thailand || KO || 5 ||
|-  style="background:#fbb;"
| 2014-02-11 || Loss ||align=left| Panpetch Kiatjarernchai ||  || Bangkok, Thailand || Decision || 5 || 3:00
|-  style="background:#fbb;"
| 2012-10-04 || Loss|| style="text-align:left;"| Thongchai Sitsongpeenong || Rajadamnern Stadium || Bangkok, Thailand || TKO (Knees)|| 4 ||
|-  style="background:#cfc;"
| 2012-07-31 || Win||align=left| Arunchai Kiatpataraphan || Lumpinee Stadium || Bangkok, Thailand || Decision || 5 || 3:00
|-  style="background:#cfc;"
| 2012-|| Win||align=left| Kongbeng Kor Romsrithong || Channel 7 Boxing Stadium || Bangkok, Thailand || Decision || 5 || 3:00
|-
! style=background:white colspan=9 |
|-  style="background:#fbb;"
| 2012-03-04 || Loss ||align=left| Arunchai Kiatpataraphan || Channel 7 Boxing Stadium || Bangkok, Thailand || Decision || 5 || 3:00
|-  style="background:#fbb;"
| 2012-01-13 || Loss ||align=left| Nopakrit Kor.Kumpanart || Lumpinee Stadium || Bangkok, Thailand || KO (Uppercut)|| 4 ||

|-  style="background:#fbb;"
| 2011-|| Loss ||align=left| Penake Sitnumnoi ||  || Songkhla province, Thailand || TKO || 3 || 

|-  style="background:#fbb;"
| 2011-10-09|| Loss ||align=left| Penake Sitnumnoi || Channel 7 Boxing Stadium || Bangkok, Thailand || Decision || 5 || 3:00
|-
! style=background:white colspan=9 |
|-  style="background:#fbb;"
| 2010-09-06 || Loss||align=left| Nong-O Gaiyanghadao || Kriangkrai Kiatpetch, Lumpinee Stadium || Bangkok, Thailand || KO || 4 || 1:42
|-  style="background:#fbb;"
| 2011-07-07 || Loss ||align=left| Singdam Kiatmuu9 || Rajadamnern Stadium || Bangkok, Thailand || Decision || 5 || 3:00
|-  style="background:#cfc;"
| 2011-06-10|| Win||align=left| Panphet Kiatjaroenchai || Rajadamnern Stadium || Bangkok, Thailand || Decision || 5 || 3:00
|-
! style=background:white colspan=9 |
|-  style="background:#fbb;"
| 2011-05-10|| Loss ||align=left| Panphet Kiatjaroenchai || Rajadamnern Stadium || Bangkok, Thailand || Decision || 5 || 3:00
|-  style="background:#fbb;"
| 2011-02-15 || Loss ||align=left| Singdam Kiatmuu9 || Lumpinee Stadium || Bangkok, Thailand || Decision || 5 || 3:00
|-  style="background:#fbb;"
| 2011-01-25|| Loss ||align=left| Penake Sitnumnoi || Lumpinee Stadium || Bangkok, Thailand || Decision|| 5 || 3:00
|-  style="background:#fbb;"
| 2010-10-23|| Loss ||align=left|  Penake Sitnumnoi || Bangla Stadium ||  Phuket, Thailand || Decision || 5 || 3:00
|-  style="background:#cfc;"
| 2010-08-04|| Win||align=left| Manasak Sitniwat|| Rajadamnern Stadium || Bangkok, Thailand || KO || 4 ||
|-  style="background:#fbb;"
| 2010-04-27 ||Loss||align=left| Penek Sitnumnoi || Lumpinee Stadium || Bangkok, Thailand || Decision || 5 || 3:00
|-  style="background:#cfc;"
| 2010-02-07 || Win ||align=left| Chamuaktong Fightermuaythai || Channel 7 Boxing Stadium || Bangkok, Thailand || Decision || 5 || 3:00
|-
! style=background:white colspan=9 | 
|-  style="background:#fbb;"
| 2009-12-23 || Loss ||align=left| Jomthong Chuwattana || Suek Sor. Sommai, Rajadamnern Stadium || Bangkok, Thailand || KO (Left Uppercut) || 2 ||
|-  style="background:#fbb;"
| 2009-10-01 || Loss||align=left| Jomthong Chuwattana || Suek Daorungchujaroen, Rajadamnern Stadium || Bangkok, Thailand || Decision || 5 || 3:00
|-
! style=background:white colspan=9 |
|-  style="background:#cfc;"
| 2009-08-06 || Win ||align=left| Singtongnoi Por.Telakun || Rajadamnern vs Lumpinee Rajadamnern Stadium || Bangkok, Thailand || Decision || 5 || 3:00
|-  style="background:#cfc;"
| 2009-04-05 || Win ||align=left| Jenrobsak Sakhomsin || Channel 7 Boxing Stadium || Bangkok, Thailand || Decision || 5 || 3:00
|-  style="background:#c5d2ea;"
| 2008-11-23 || Draw||align=left| Singtongnoi Por.Telakun || Channel 7 Boxing Stadium || Bangkok, Thailand || Decision || 5 || 3:00
|-  style="background:#cfc;"
| 2008-08-24 || Win ||align=left| Punyai Payapkumpan || Channel 7 Boxing Stadium || Bangkok, Thailand || Decision || 5 || 3:00
|-  style="background:#cfc;"
| 2006-08-20 || Win ||align=left| Sakunpetchlek  Por Sakulpetch|| Channel 7 Boxing Stadium || Bangkok, Thailand || Decision || 5 || 3:00
|-
! style=background:white colspan=9 | 
|-  style="background:#cfc;"
| 2002-11-16 || Win ||align=left| Lomsuphaphan Pet Pet|| Channel 7 Boxing Stadium || Bangkok, Thailand || Decision || 5 || 3:00
|-
! style=background:white colspan=9 | 
|-
| colspan=9 | Legend:    

|-  style="background:#fbb;"
| 2014-05-|| Loss||align=left| Andrei Kulebin || I.F.M.A. World Muaythai Championships 2014, Semi Finals -67 kg || Langkawi, Malaysia || ||  ||
|- 
! style=background:white colspan=9 |

|-  style="background:#cfc;"
| 2014-05-|| Win ||align=left| Sergey Kulyaba || I.F.M.A. World Muaythai Championships 2014, Quarter Finals -67 kg || Langkawi, Malaysia || ||  ||
|-
| colspan=9 | Legend:

References

1987 births
Sittisak Petpayathai
Living people
Sittisak Petpayathai